The moth family Sesiidae has 108 representatives in China.

For  a list of moths in China in other families, see List of moths of China.

Bembecia bestianeli (Capuse, 1973)
Bembecia ceiformis (Staudinger, 1881)
Bembecia hedysari Yang & Wang, 1994
Bembecia insidiosa (Le Cerf, 1911)
Bembecia lasicera (Hampson, 1906)
Bembecia scopigera (Scopoli, 1763)
Bembecia sophoracola Xu & Jin, 1999
Bembecia tancrei (Püngeler, 1905)
Bembecia viguraea (Püngeler, 1912)
Chamaesphecia astatiformis (Herrich-Schäffer, 1845)
Chamaesphecia colochelyna Bryk, 1947
Chamaesphecia schroederi Tosevski, 1993
Cissuvora huoshanensis Xu, 1993
Cissuvora romanovi (Leech, 1888)
Euhagena variegata (Walker, 1864)
Heliodinesesia ulmi Yang & Wang, 1989
Macroscelesia longipes (Moore, 1877)
Melittia bombyliformis (Cramer, 1782)
Melittia eurytion (Westwood, 1848)
Melittia formosana Matsumura, 1911
Melittia gigantea (Moore, 1879)
Melittia indica Butler, 1874
Melittia japona Hampson, 1919
Melittia sangaica Moore, 1877
Nokona pernix (Leech, 1888)
Oligophlebiella polishana Strand, 1916
Paradoxecia gravis (Walker, [1865])
Paradoxecia pieli Lieu, 1935
Paranthrene actinidiae Yang & Wang, 1989
Paranthrene aurivena (Bryk, 1947)
Paranthrene bicincta (Walker, 1864)
Paranthrene chinensis (Leech, 1889)
Paranthrene chrysoidea Zukowsky, 1932
Paranthrene pompilus Bryk, 1947
Paranthrene regalis (Butler, 1878)
Paranthrene semidiaphana Zukowaky, 1929
Paranthrene tabaniformis (Rottemburg, 1775)
Paranthrene trizonata (Hampson, 1900)
Paranthrenopsis pogonias (Bryk, 1947)
Paranthrenopsis siniaevi Gorbunov & Arita, 2000
Pennisetia fixseni (Leech, 1888)
Pennisetia hylaeiformis (Laspeyres, 1801)
Pyropteron chrysoneura (Püngeler, 1912)
Rectala asyliformis Bryk, 1947
Scalarignathia kaszabi Capuse, 1973
Scalarignathia sinensis (Hampson, 1919)
Scasiba caryavora Xu, 1994
Scasiba taikanensis Matsumura, 1931
Sesia gloriosa (Le Cerf, 1914)
Sesia huaxica Xu, 1995
Sesia oberthueri (Le Cerf, 1914)
Sesia przewalskii (Alphéraky, 1882)
Sesia rhynchioides (Butler, 1881)
Sesia sheni Arita & Xu, 1994
Sesia siningensis (Xu, 1981)
Sesia solitera Spatenka & Arita, 1992
Sesia tibetensis Arita & Xu, 1994
Sphecosesia litchivora Yang & Wang, 1989
Sphecosesia lushanensis Xu & Liu, 1999
Sphecosesia nonggangensis Yang & Wang, 1989
Synanthedon auripes (Hampson, 1892)
Synanthedon auriplena (Walker, 1964)
Synanthedon bicingulata Staudinger, 1887
Synanthedon castanevora Yang & Wang, 1989
Synanthedon concavifascia Le Cerf, 1916
Synanthedon culiciformis (Linnaeus, 1758)
Synanthedon hector (Butler, 1878)
Synanthedon heilongjiangana Zhang, 1987
Synanthedon hippophae Xu, Jin & Liu, 1997
Synanthedon hongye Yang, 1977
Synanthedon howqua (Moore, 1877)
Synanthedon hunanensis Xu & Liu, 1992
Synanthedon jinghongensis Yang & Wang, 1989
Synanthedon kunmingensis Yang & Wang, 1989
Synanthedon leucocyanea Zukowsky, 1929
Synanthedon melli (Zukowsky, 1929)
Synanthedon menglaensis Yang & Wang, 1989
Synanthedon moganensis Yang & Wang, 1992
Synanthedon moupinicola Dalla Torre & Strand, 1925
Synanthedon mushana (Matsumura, 1931)
Synanthedon sassafras Xu, 1997
Synanthedon scoliaeformis (Borkhausen, 1789)
Synanthedon serica (Alphéraky, 1882)
Synanthedon sodalis Püngeler, 1912
Synanthedon tenuis (Butler, 1878)
Synanthedon tipuliformis (Clerck, 1759)
Synanthedon ulmicola Yang & Wang, 1989
Synanthedon unocingulata Bartel, 1912
Tinthia beijingana Yang, 1977
Tinthia cuprealis (Moore, 1877)
Tinthia cupreipennis (Walker, [1865])
Tinthia varipes Walker, [1865]
Toleria abiaeformis Walker, 1864
Toleria sinensis (Walker, 1864)
Trichocerota brachythyra Hampson, 1919
Trichocerota dizona Hampson, 1919
Trichocerota leiaeformis (Walker, 1856)
Trilochana caseariae Yang & Wang, 1989
Zenodoxus flavus Xu & Liu, 1992
Zenodoxus fuscus Xu & Liu, 1992
Zenodoxus issikii Yano, 1960
Zenodoxus meilinensis Xu & Liu, 1993
Zenodoxus rubripectus Xu & Liu, 1993
Zenodoxus simifuscus Xu & Liu, 1993
Zenodoxus taiwanellus Matsumura, 1931
Zenodoxus tianpingensis Xu & Liu, 1993
Zenodoxus trifasciatus Yano, 1960
Zhuosesia zhuoxiana Yang, 1977

References
Catalogue of the family Sesiidae in China (Lepidoptera: Sesiidae)

.S
China
Moths
China